Burundi national under-20 football team, also known Burundi Under-20s or Burundi U20(s), represents Burundi in association football at an under-20 age level and is controlled by the Football Federation of Burundi, the governing body for football in Burundi.

Honours
CECAFA U-20 Championship:
Runners-up (2): 2005, 2006

Players

Current squad
 The following players were called up for the 2022 CECAFA U-20 Championship.
 Match dates: 28 October – 11 November 2022
Caps and goals correct as of: 24 October 2022

Tournament history

FIFA U-20 World Cup

Recent results and fixtures

2018

2019

References

Burundi national football team
African national under-20 association football teams